Treigny-Perreuse-Sainte-Colombe is a commune in the Yonne department in Bourgogne-Franche-Comté in north-central France. It was established on 1 January 2019 by merger of the former communes of Treigny (the seat) and Sainte-Colombe-sur-Loing.

Its territory straddles the natural regions of Puisaye (Treigny) and Forterre (Perreuse and Sainte-Colombe).

See also
Communes of the Yonne department

References

Communes of Yonne